The 2021 Seoul Dynasty season will be the fourth season of the Seoul Dynasty's existence in the Overwatch League and the team's second under head coach  Park "Changgoon" Chang-geun.

Preceding offseason

Roster changes 

The Dynasty entered free agency with six free agents, five of which became free agents due to the team not exercising the option to retain the player for another year.

Acquisitions 
The Dynasty's first and only offseason acquisitions were Park "Saebyeolbe" Jong-ryeol, a veteran damage player and former team captain of the New York Excelsior, and Jung "Anamo" Tae-sung, a veteran support player described as "steadfast and cautious" also coming from the Excelior, both of whom were signed on November 29, 2020.

Departures 
Six of the Dynasty's seven free agents did not return, five of which signed with other teams, beginning with tank player Choi "Michelle" Min-hyuk, who signed with the Toronto Defiant on November 24, 2020. The Dynasty lost support player Kim "Slime" Seong-jun to the Florida Mayhem on December 11. On January 20, 2021, damage player Park "Illicit" Je-min signed with Overwatch Contenders team Team BM. Three months later, on April 8, Support player Yang "Tobi" Jin-mo signed with the Philadelphia Fusion. Additionally, support player Choi "Bdosin" Seung-tae announced his retirement in the offseason.

Regular season

May Melee 
The Dynasty began their 2021 season on April 17 with a 1–3 loss to the Philadelphia Fusion in the May Melee qualifiers. In their following match, they swept the Guangzhou Charge 3–0.

Final roster

Standings

Game log

Regular season 

|2021 season schedule

Postseason

References 

Seoul Dynasty
Seoul Dynasty
Seoul Dynasty seasons